Wyszogóra  is a settlement in the administrative district of Gmina Płoty, within Gryfice County, West Pomeranian Voivodeship, in north-western Poland.

The village was known in German as Piepenburg.

See also
History of Pomerania

References

Villages in Gryfice County